First Night was a BBC 1 series of contemporary television dramas by new writers, which ran from September 1963 to May 1964 and was the forerunner of The Wednesday Play. The series was produced by James MacTaggart. Nigel Kneale's The Road was produced under the show's banner. Only a single episode (Maggie) is known to exist. The rest of the series, including The Road, is considered lost.

References

1963 British television series debuts
1964 British television series endings
1960s British drama television series
BBC television dramas
Black-and-white British television shows
1960s British anthology television series
English-language television shows
Lost BBC episodes
Social realism